Michael Petri (born 23 November 1977) is a German former professional footballer who played as a striker. He spent much of his career in the South-west region, but also played for VfL Osnabrück, for whom he made 25 appearances in the 2. Bundesliga.

External links

1977 births
Living people
German footballers
Association football forwards
1. FC Saarbrücken players
VfL Osnabrück players
SV Elversberg players
FC 08 Homburg players
SV Röchling Völklingen players